Les Mousquetaires, known as  in Portugal, is a privately owned retailing symbol group based in France and operating internationally. Its head office is in Bondoufle, France.

It operates several different brands for different retail segments, which are mostly suffixed by the term "marché" (French for market). The stores are independent businesses, but they are supplied with products and central services by Les Mousquetaires group.

Footnotes

External links
Les Mousquetaires site
Les Mousquetaires site 
Os Mosqueteiros site 
Intermarché site
Restaumarché site
Netto site 
Vêti Site 
Roady Site 

Supermarkets of France
Retail companies established in 1969
Companies based in Île-de-France